Spacebound is a digital EP released by the Christian group Group 1 Crew.  The EP very much deviates from their normal Hip Hop/Rap sound, moving to—as many call it—a The Black Eyed Peas sound. The song Breakdown had previously been released as a digital single. It charted at No. 22 on [[Billboard (magazine)|Billboard'''s]] Christian Albums and No. 35 on Billboard'''s Heatseekers Albums.

Track listing

Writers and producers
Andy Anderson, Christopher Stevens, Garcia, Justin Boller, Group 1 Crew

References 

2010 EPs
Fervent Records albums
Group 1 Crew albums